Cymothoe aurivillii is a butterfly in the family Nymphalidae. It is found in Tanzania. The habitat consists of sub-montane and montane forests.

The larvae feed on Rawsonia usambarensis.

Subspecies
Cymothoe aurivillii aurivillii (Tanzania: Uluguru Mountains)
Cymothoe aurivillii handeni Rydon, 1996 (Tanzania: Nguu Mountains)
Cymothoe aurivillii latifasciata Rydon, 1996 (Tanzania: Udzungwa Mountains)
Cymothoe aurivillii nguru Rydon, 1996 (Tanzania: Nguru Mountains)
Cymothoe aurivillii tenuifasciae Rydon, 1996 (Tanzania: Rubeho Mountains)

References

Butterflies described in 1899
Cymothoe (butterfly)
Endemic fauna of Tanzania
Butterflies of Africa
Taxa named by Otto Staudinger